The United Investment and Trading Company (UNITIC), formerly UNIS Holding BiH, is a joint venture company between UNIS Holding and Kuwait Consulting & Investment Co. The company owns and operates the 315-foot UNITIC Twin Skyscrapers in Sarajevo, Bosnia and Herzegovina. The company was formed in 1998 and has since then invested KM 45 million in renovating the UNITIC Business Center.

History
The UNITIC Twin Skyscrapers, designed by Ivan Štraus, were built in the 1980s in the Marijin dvor neighborhood of Sarajevo. They were colloquially named "Momo and Uzeir" after two characters from a radio comedy show, a Serb and a Bosniak. The towers were heavily damaged by shelling during the siege of Sarajevo in the Bosnian War, but remained standing, becoming symbols of resilience. They were renovated after the war.

Facilities
UNITIC offers its clients office space and meeting rooms which can be rented for long durations of time. As of the end of 2005 and the beginning of 2006, the UNITIC Complex was at 90% occupancy rate. This has prompted the corporation to seek expansion.

The UNITIC website states this as the future plan of the company:
"Future plans of UNITIC were directed to both new activities and extension towards hotel Holiday Inn in order to create an integral whole and contribute to completion of the facilities of the Center itself."

Local media reports from mid-2006 stated that UNITIC was planning a new tower for its complex, the new tower would stand at 30 floors height, greatly expanding the company's space. The worth of the proposed project would be KM 70 million.

Office space
Sberbank BH 
International Red Cross and Red Crescent Movement-Delegation in Bosnia and Herzegovina
Avon Cosmetics
Organisation for Economic Co-operation and Development
Organization for Security and Co-operation in Europe
Sarajevo Stock Exchange (Sarajevska Berza)
Raiffeisen Brokers
UNHCR
Sony
Petrol BH Oil Company
Oracle Software 
Radio Slobodna Evropa
SoftNET d.o.o.

References

External links

UNITIC Website
UNITIC Twins Sarajevo Construction Forum
UNITIC Plans New Skyscraper With 30 Floors in Bosnian

Companies based in Sarajevo
Buildings and structures in Sarajevo
Office buildings in Bosnia and Herzegovina
Skyscraper office buildings in Bosnia and Herzegovina
Twin towers
Office buildings completed in 1986
1986 establishments in Yugoslavia